Banissa (also spelled 'Banisa') is a town in Kenya's Mandera County. The headquarters of Banissa sub-county are located in the town.

References 

Populated places in Mandera County